The 2009–10 Biathlon World Cup – Individual Women started on Wednesday December 2, 2009 in Östersund and finished Thursday February 18, 2009 in Vancouver at the Olympic Biathlon event. Defending titlist is Magdalena Neuner of Germany.

Competition format
The 15 kilometres (9.3 mi) individual race is the oldest biathlon event; the distance is skied over five laps. The biathlete shoots four times at any shooting lane, in the order of prone, standing, prone, standing, totalling 20 targets. For each missed target a fixed penalty time, usually one minute, is added to the skiing time of the biathlete. Competitors' starts are staggered, normally by 30 seconds.

2008-09 Top 3 Standings

Medal winners

Standings

References

- Individual Women, 2009-10 Biathlon World Cup